Paltrow is a surname. Notable people with the surname include:

 Bruce Weigert Paltrow (1943–2002) American film director and producer 
 Gwyneth Paltrow (born 1972) American actress
 Jake Paltrow (born 1975) American film director
 Rebekah Neumann (born Rebekah Victoria Paltrow; 1978) an American entrepreneur and businesswoman

Jewish surnames
Patronymic surnames
Surnames of Polish origin